Calamanthus is a genus of bird in the family Acanthizidae. 

A poorly researched genus, the alliance has been recognised as a single species treatment (Schodde, 1975) and later two species or provisionally three separate species.
Birds of the World: Recommended English Names lists the following three species:
 Calamanthus campestris, rufous fieldwren
 Calamanthus fuliginosus, striated fieldwren
Calamanthus montanellus, Western fieldwren - sometimes considered a subspecies of the rufous fieldwren Calamanthus campestris (C. campestris montanellus)

References

 Del Hoyo, J.; Elliot, A. & Christie D. (editors). (2006). Handbook of the Birds of the World. Volume 12: Picathartes to Tits and Chickadees. Lynx Edicions. 

 
Bird genera
Taxa named by John Gould
Taxonomy articles created by Polbot